The Capestrina is an indigenous breed of domestic goat from the southern part of Lazio, in southern central Italy. It originates in the provinces of Frosinone, Latina and Rome, on the spines of the Monti Aurunci, the Monti Ausoni and the Monti Lepini. It is also raised in the Monti delle Mainarde and in the Val Comino, and on the Monti Prenestini. Its geographical range is similar to that of the Bianca Monticellana and the Ciociara Grigia; it is however usually found on higher and less accessible terrain than those breeds.

The Capestrina is one of the forty-three autochthonous Italian goat breeds of limited distribution for which a herdbook is kept by the Associazione Nazionale della Pastorizia, the Italian national association of sheep- and goat-breeders.

Use

The average milk yield of the Capestrina, over and above that taken by the kids, is  litres in 100 days for primiparous,  litres in 150 days for secondiparous, and  litres in 150 days for pluriparous, nannies.

References

Goat breeds
Dairy goat breeds
Meat goat breeds
Goat breeds originating in Italy